Rita Musamali (born 21 May 1999) is a Ugandan cricketer. In July 2018, she was named in Uganda's squad for the 2018 ICC Women's World Twenty20 Qualifier tournament. She made her Women's Twenty20 International (WT20I) for Uganda against Scotland in the World Twenty20 Qualifier on 7 July 2018.

In April 2019, she was named in Uganda's squad for the 2019 ICC Women's Qualifier Africa tournament in Zimbabwe. On 20 June 2019, in the Kwibuka Women's T20 Tournament match against Mali, Musamali scored 103 not out. She was the leading run-scorer in the tournament, with 189 runs in six matches.

In March 2023, Musamali became one of the Uganda Cricket Association's first twelve women players to be awarded central contracts.

See also
 List of centuries in women's Twenty20 International cricket

References

External links
 

1999 births
Living people
Ugandan women cricketers
Uganda women Twenty20 International cricketers
Place of birth missing (living people)